De Smet is a city in and the county seat of Kingsbury County, South Dakota, United States. The population was 1,089 at the 2010 census.

History
Located in the area of South Dakota known as "East River" (east of the Missouri River, which diagonally divides the state), De Smet was platted by European Americans in 1880. It was named for Belgian Father Pierre De Smet, a 19th-century Jesuit missionary who worked with Native Americans in the United States and its territories for most of his life. In the mid 1880s, prairie fires and failures of crops after a three-year period of drought caused many settlers to relocate their farms and homesteads to easier areas. By 1917, De Smet was a cow town, with many trains passing through every day carrying cattle to market.

The Charles Ingalls family, originally of Wisconsin, arrived in De Smet in 1879. Their travels and pioneer life in Minnesota, Kansas, Dakota Territory, and Iowa would be later chronicled in the Little House series of books written by the Ingallses' second oldest daughter, Laura Elizabeth - later known as Laura Ingalls Wilder. Laura Ingalls and her husband Almanzo Wilder would first settle in De Smet along with Wilder's parents and brother. There the Wilders lived just outside of De Smet on farmland, while the Ingallses stayed in the town of De Smet. After building a home and starting a business there, Charles Ingalls helped to found the First Congregational Church of De Smet, later helping to build the church building, with the first service being held there on August 30, 1882. Ingalls and his wife, along with oldest daughter Mary, were among the church's eight original charter members.

Geography
De Smet is located in central Kingsbury County at  (44.385871, -97.551703).

De Smet has been assigned the ZIP code 57231 and the FIPS place code 16260.

Climate

Demographics

2010 census
At the 2010 census there were 1,089 people, 478 households, and 290 families living in the city. The racial makeup of the city was 98.8% White, 0.1% African American, 0.6% Native American, 0.1% Asian, and 0.5% from two or more races. Hispanic or Latino of any race were 0.5%.

Of the 478 households 24.3% had children under the age of 18 living with them, 52.3% were married couples living together, 5.4% had a female householder with no husband present, 2.9% had a male householder with no wife present, and 39.3% were non-families. 35.6% of households were one person and 22.6% were one person aged 65 or older. The average household size was 2.17 and the average family size was 2.83.

The median age was 49.6 years. 22% of residents were under the age of 18; 4.1% were between the ages of 18 and 24; 17.9% were from 25 to 44; 26% were from 45 to 64; and 29.9% were 65 or older. The gender makeup of the city was 47.2% male and 52.8% female.

2000 census
At the 2000 census there were 1,164 people, 524 households, and 300 families living in the city. The population density was 1,102.2 people per square mile (424.0/km). There were 582 housing units at an average density of 551.1 per square mile (212.0/km).  The racial makeup of the city was 98.37% White, 0.95% Native American, 0.09% Asian, 0.09% from other races, and 0.52% from two or more races. Hispanic or Latino of any race were 0.69%.

Of the 524 households 24.8% had children under the age of 18 living with them, 50.0% were married couples living together, 3.2% had a female householder with no husband present, and 42.7% were non-families. 39.3% of households were one person and 24.2% were one person aged 65 or older. The average household size was 2.09 and the average family size was 2.80.

The age distribution was 20.8% under the age of 18, 6.0% from 18 to 24, 21.1% from 25 to 44, 20.8% from 45 to 64, and 31.3% 65 or older. The median age was 47 years. For every 100 females, there were 89.0 males. For every 100 females age 18 and over, there were 87.0 males.

The median household income was $27,760, and the median family income  was $41,989. Males had a median income of $24,722 versus $20,417 for females. The per capita income for the city was $15,372. About 7.3% of families and 11.1% of the population were below the poverty line, including 7.1% of those under age 18 and 18.3% of those age 65 or over.

Attractions

Since 1971, De Smet has hosted a pageant, held over several weekends in July, to honor Laura Ingalls Wilder. Five of her classic Little House books were based on her experiences in and around the community. The books were popularized anew in the 1970s and early 1980s, from the long-running TV series Little House on the Prairie, which was loosely based on them.

The story of how Charles Ingalls, his wife Caroline, and four daughters arrived in De Smet in 1879 by covered wagon from Walnut Grove, Minnesota, is told by a cast of thirty in an open-air theater near the old Ingalls homestead and the Surveyors' House. Nearby are Silver Lake and the Big Slough, locales mentioned in her books. Reminders of De Smet's pioneer past are evident throughout the town, including the First Congregational Church, where the Ingalls family worshipped.

In 1894, Laura and her husband Almanzo Wilder, with their daughter Rose, left De Smet to live on a farm in the Ozarks near Mansfield, Missouri. There, Laura Ingalls Wilder chronicled her South Dakota memories in such works as By the Shores of Silver Lake, The Long Winter, Little Town on the Prairie, and These Happy Golden Years. Many residents in De Smet have made a special effort to learn the Ingalls' stories in hopes of assisting inquiring tourists each summer.

Transportation
 De Smet stands at the intersection of the east–west U.S. Route 14 (5th Street) and South Dakota Highway 25 (Poinsett Avenue), which runs north–south.
 The Rapid City, Pierre and Eastern Railroad's freight-only line between Tracy, Minnesota, and Rapid City passes through the town.

Notable people
 
De Smet is the town where the family of author Laura Ingalls Wilder finally settled,, and is the birthplace of Ingalls Wilder's daughter, author and activist Rose Wilder Lane. Ingalls Wilder's father, Charles Ingalls, moved  to De Smet in 1879 with his wife, Caroline, and their children Mary, Laura, Carrie, and Grace. There, after first living in the Surveyor House and a couple of other locations in De Smet, Ingalls built their permanent home that became known via Wilder's writings as "The House That Pa Built". 

Construction on the house began in 1887 and was completed in 1889. After settling in De Smet, Charles Ingalls owned and operated the Ingalls Store from 1880–1881, a small general-type store that sold various goods for the home. While the store building no longer exists, the location is noted in De Smet's downtown area with a marker on what's currently on the site, a former bank building that now houses Gass Law Firm.

De Smet was also the childhood home of supercentenarian Walter Breuning. Artist-illustrator Harvey Dunn was born in 1884 approximately eight miles from De Smet near Manchester, and painted scenes of frontier life in his later years. Harry George Armstrong, a major general in the United States Air Force, a physician, and an airman, was born in De Smet in 1899.

See also
 List of cities in South Dakota

References

External links

 De Smet Chamber of Commerce
 Ingalls Homestead
 Laura Ingalls Wilder Memorial Society
 Laura Ingalls Wilder Pageant
 De Smet School District

 
1880 establishments in Dakota Territory
Cities in Kingsbury County, South Dakota
Cities in South Dakota
County seats in South Dakota
Populated places established in 1880